Clavell is a surname. Notable people with the surname include:

George Clavell, English politician
James Clavell, British/American novelist
John Clavell, 17th century adventurer
Michaela Clavell, actress
Rodney Clavell, former South Australian corrections officer and prisoner at Yatala Labour Prison

See also
Clavell Tower, in Dorset, England
 Cavell (surname)